The Women's 25 metre air pistol took place on 10 April 2018 at the Belmont Shooting Centre, Brisbane. There was a qualification in which the top 8 athletes qualified for the finals.

Results

Qualification

Finals

Key
QF = Qualified for Finals
GR = Games record
SO = Athlete eliminated by Shoot-off for tie

References

External links
Schedule of events at 2018 Commonwealth games-Gold Coast

Shooting at the 2018 Commonwealth Games
Comm